Wu Yuhang (born 3 June 1997) is a Chinese swimmer. He competed in the men's 200 metre butterfly event at the 2016 Summer Olympics.

References

External links
 

1997 births
Living people
Chinese male butterfly swimmers
Olympic swimmers of China
Swimmers at the 2016 Summer Olympics
Place of birth missing (living people)
21st-century Chinese people